The 2017 Utah Utes volleyball team will represent the University of Utah in the 2017 NCAA Division I women's volleyball season. The Utes are led by twenty-eighth year head coach Beth Launiere and play their home games at the Huntsman Center. The Utes are members of the Pac-12 Conference.

Utah comes off a season where they went 20–12, 11–9 in conference. They earned an at-large NCAA Tournament at-large slot where they lost to UNLV in the first round. The Utes enter the season having been picked to finish fourth in the 2017 pre-season Pac-12 poll.

Season highlights 
Season highlights will be filled in as the season progresses.

Roster

Schedule 

 *-Indicates Conference Opponent
 y-Indicates NCAA Playoffs
 Times listed are Mountain Time Zone.

Announcers for televised games 
All home conference games will be on Pac-12 Networks or P12 Digital Network. All Pac-12 Network games will be on the National Feed and Mountain Feed unless noted otherwise. Select road games will also be televised or streamed.

 Kentucky: Courtney Lyle & Jenny Hazelwood
 Hawai'i: Kanoa Leahey, Chris McLaughlin, & Ryan Kalei Tsuji
 BYU: Thad Anderson & Amy Gant
 Utah Valley: Matthew Baiamonte & Kyle Bruderer
 Colorado: Thad Anderson & Amy Gant
 Cal: Thad Anderson
 Oregon: Thad Anderson & Amy Gant
 Oregon State: Thad Anderson
 Washington: Elise Woodward & Amy Gant
 Washington State: Anne Marie Anderson
 Arizona: No commentary
 Arizona State: Kate Scott & Dain Blanton
 UCLA: Thad Anderson & Mike Dodd
 USC: Thad Anderson & Holly McPeak
 Oregon: Rich Burk & Amy Gant
 Oregon State: No commentary
 Washington State:
 Washington:
 USC:
 UCLA:
 Arizona State:
 Arizona:
 Stanford:
 Colorado:

References 

2017
2017 in sports in Utah
Utah